Austin Edward Werring Parsons (born 9 January 1949, Glasgow) is a former Scottish-born cricketer who played for Auckland and Sussex.

See also
 List of Auckland representative cricketers

External links
 
 Austin Parsons at CricketArchive

1949 births
Living people
Cricketers from Glasgow
Scottish cricketers
Auckland cricketers
Sussex cricketers